Misty Massey is an American fantasy author. Her first novel, Mad Kestrel, was published in 2008 by Tor Books. It was given a three-star rating by Romantic Times. Massey has also published short stories in magazines.

Massey is one of the founding members of the blog, MagicalWords.net. Magical Words is dedicated to helping newer writers with all aspects of the craft and business of writing, and a book based on the blog, How To Write Magical Words: A Writer's Companion was published by Bella Rosa Books in 2011.

Massey lives in South Carolina with her husband and son. She works as a middle school librarian. Hobbies include belly dancing and playing a pirate at Renaissance fairs.

References

External links
 Official homepage
 A Hazardous Occupation - Misty Massey's Livejournal blog
 Magical Words - Writing blog of Misty Massey, David B. Coe, Faith Hunter, A.J. Hartley, Stuart Jaffe, and Edmund R. Schubert

Reviews

21st-century American novelists
American fantasy writers
American librarians
American women novelists
Living people
Novelists from South Carolina
Year of birth missing (living people)
Women science fiction and fantasy writers
21st-century American women writers
American women librarians